The Strike can refer to:

 The Strike, one of a long-running series of Comic Strip Presents... short comedy films
 The Strike (1904 film), a 1904 French film directed by Ferdinand Zecca
 The Strike (1914 film), a 1914 Swedish film directed by Victor Sjöström
 The Strike (1947 film), a 1947 Czech film
 The Strike (Seinfeld), an episode of Seinfeld
 Bass Pro Shops: The Strike, a video game for the Xbox 360 and Wii that is often shorted to "The Strike".
 The Strike was a working title for Ayn Rand's novel Atlas Shrugged.